This is a chronological list of compositions by Canadian pianist and broadcaster Glenn Gould.

Completed original works
 A Merry Thought, for piano (1941; earliest surviving work)
 Our Gifts, for voice & piano (1943)
 Rondo in D major, piano (1948)
 Suite for Twelfth Night, for piano (1949; MS lost):
 Nocturne
 Whimsical Nonsense
 Elizabethan Gaiety
 Regal Atmosphere
 Sonata for Piano (1948–50)
 5 Short Piano Pieces (c. 1949–50)
 Sonata for Bassoon and Piano (1950)
 Prelude, Cantilena and Gigue, for clarinet & bassoon (1951)
 2 Piano Pieces (1951)
 Three Fugues on One Subject, No. 2 (1952)
 String Quartet in F minor, Op. 1 (1953–55)
 So You Want to Write a Fugue?, for 4 solo voices & piano or string quartet (1957–58)
 Lieberson Madrigal, for 4 solo voices (1964)
 From Chilkoot's Icy Glacier, for 4 solo voices (1967)

Unfinished, lost, and projected works
 Variations in G minor, piano (1949)
 2 Pieces for organ (1950)
 String Trio (1950)
 [The Metamorphosis], opera based on the short story by Franz Kafka (c. 1956)
 Sonata for Clarinet and Piano (late 1950s)
 [Portrait of John Donne], song cycle for mezzo-soprano and piano, based on John Donne's Holy Sonnets (1959–64)
 A Letter from Stalingrad, concert aria (early 1960s)
 Dr. Strauss Writes an Opera, opera based on the life of Richard Strauss (early to mid-1960s)
 Sonata in E-flat major, for wind ensemble and strings (c. 1964)

Arrangements and cadenzas
 Beethoven, Piano Concerto No. 1, cadenzas to first and third movements (1954–56)
 Handel, Prelude from Harpsichord Suite No. 1, arrangement of (1972)
 Wagner, three transcriptions for piano (1972–73): 
 Siegfried Idyll
 Prelude to Act I of Die Meistersinger von Nürnberg
 Dawn and Siegfried's Rhine Journey from Götterdämmerung
 Ravel, La valse, arrangement of the composer's piano transcription (1975)
 Strauss, Oboe Concerto, arrangement for oboe and piano (1982)

Recordings
 String Quartet in F minor, Op. 1. The Symphonia Quartet (Kurt Loebel & Elmer Setzer - violins; Tom Brennand - viola; Thomas Liberti - cello). Columbia Records ML 5578 (1960) / Sony 88697147582 (2007).
 Lieberson Madrigal; String Quartet in F minor, Op. 1; Two Pieces for Piano; Sonata for Bassoon and Piano; Piano Sonata (unfinished); "So You Want to Write a Fugue?". Claron McFadden - soprano; Marie-Thérèse Keller - mezzo-soprano; Jean-Paul Fouchécourt - tenor; Harry Van der Kamp - bass; Bruno Monsaingeon & Gilles Apap - violins; Gérard Caussé - viola; Alain Meunier - cello; Catherine Marchese - bassoon; Emile Naoumoff - piano; Nicolas Rivenq - conductor. Sony SK 47 184 (1992).

References
 Bazzana, Kevin. 2005. Wondrous Strange: The Life And Art Of Glenn Gould, pp. 50, 135–142, 275–284. Oxford University Press, .
 
 

Glenn Gould
Gould, Glenn